The 2K6 Luna is a Soviet short-range artillery rocket complex. Luna rockets are solid-fuel, unguided and spin-stabilized. "2K6" is its GRAU designation. Its NATO reporting names are FROG-3 (with 3R9 missile) and FROG-5 (with 3R10 missile). From 1965, the 2K6 Luna was replaced by the far more successful 9K52 Luna-M, which was known in the West as the FROG-7.

Design history
The Luna system was developed in NII-1 from 1953, under the supervision of N. P. Mazurov. Luna followed the earlier designs 2K1 Mars and 2K4 Filin. While NII-1 was responsible for the rocket, the launch and transporter-loader vehicles were designed by TsNII-58. The initial system name was S-125A "Pion". In 1957 the prototypes of the launch vehicle (SPU S-123A on Ob'yekt 160 chassis), the transloader (TZM S-124A on Ob'yekt 161 chassis) and the 3R5 rocket were ready for evaluations. These were carried out in 1958 in Kapustin Yar and in 1959 in the Transbaikal Military District.  As a result of these evaluations, it was decided to abandon the TZM, to improve the SPU and to redesign the rocket. This led to the development of the 3R9 and 3R10 rockets.  The decision to start series production was taken on 29 December 1959. The first five systems were ready in January 1960 after which the state acceptance trials were carried out until March of that same year. In 1960 the Luna system entered service with the Soviet Army where it remained until 1982. From 1960 till 1964, a total of 432 SPU 2P16s were produced. In the first year alone, 80 launch vehicles and 365 rockets were made from the manufacturing lines.

System description
The missile complex consisted of 
 the launch vehicle SPU 2P16 (Ob'yekt 160), based on a modified PT-76B chassis with return rollers and fitted with a launch rail, elevation mechanism, stabilizing jacks and a generator. Combat weight was 18 t;
 the rocket 3R9 with conventional HE warhead 3N15 and with a range of 12 to 44.6 km,
 the rocket 3R10 with a 400 kg nuclear warhead 3N14 and with a range of 10 to 32.1 km;
 a 2U663 missile transporter,  based on the ZiL-157V, with 2 missiles;
 a  2U662 vehicle to transport and store nuclear warheads;
 a mobile crane ADK K52 (on MAZ-502), ADK K61 (on MAZ-200) or 9T31 (on Ural-375);
 sets of maintenance vehicles PRTB-1, 2U659 etc.;
 control and command vehicle PU-2 and
 a training set with training rocket PV-65 or 3R11 with training warhead 3N16.

There have been a couple of variants of the launch vehicle, for example the 2P21, also known as Br-226-II, on ZiL-134 8x8 truck, but these never entered service.

The FROG-6 is, according to Western sources the NATO designator for the truck-based training system PV-65. Russian sources however claim that this system is the prototype of the Br-226-I launch vehicle on KrAZ-214.

Operational history
Luna entered service in 1960 and remained in service with the Soviet Army until 1982. Each Motorised Rifle and Tank Division had one Rocket Battalion with two batteries, each with two 2P16s. During the Cuban Missile Crisis, 36 2K6 missiles (24 with conventional warheads, 12 with two-kiloton nuclear warheads) with six launchers were located in Cuba. Although some authorities dispute whether local commanders had authority to use nuclear weapons, they were present and it is argued that if pressured, Soviet soldiers might have used them.

Operators

Current 
 : 13
 : 21
 : 65
 : 24
 : 24
 : 20
 : 24 TELs for Luna and Luna-M
 : 30
 : 12

Former 

 : 13
 : 21 with 3R9 rockets in 1962-1982
 
 : 200
 : 4

References

External links
 Military analysis network: FROG-3
 2K6 Luna on Military Russia (in Russian)
 Walkaround of 2P16 with 3R9 rocket in Saratov, on DishModels.ru

Rocket artillery
Unguided nuclear rockets of the Soviet Union
Cold War weapons of the Soviet Union
Military vehicles introduced in the 1960s